Radun may refer to:

Radun, Belarus (previously in Poland)
Raduň, Czech Republic
Raduń, Pomeranian Voivodeship, Poland
Raduń railway station
Raduń, Choszczno County, West Pomeranian Voivodeship, Poland
Raduń, Gryfice County, West Pomeranian Voivodeship, Poland
Raduń, Gryfino County, West Pomeranian Voivodeship, Poland

See also

Piz Radun, a Swiss mountain
Raduń Yeshiva originally in Raduń, Poland (now in Belarus)